Chas Cronk is an English musician, best known as the bass player and acoustic guitarist for the Strawbs from 1973 to 1980 and again from 2004 to the present. Chas also toured and recorded with Steve Hackett and Rick Wakeman in the 1980s and Cry No More in the 1980/90s. He released a solo album, Liberty, in March 2022 on Renaissance Records (USA).

Discography

Albums

Phillip Goodhand-Tait band
Songfall (1972)

Strawbs
Hero and Heroine (1974)
Ghosts (1974)
Nomadness (1975)
Deep Cuts (1976)
Burning for You  (1977)
Deadlines (1978)
Heartbreak Hill (1978)
Blue Angel (2003)
Déjà Fou (2004)
Strawbs Live at Nearfest 2004 (2005)
A Taste of Strawbs (2006) (box with 4 CDs, recordings 1967–2006)
Strawbs NY '75 (2007) (live recording of a 1975 show)
Lay Down with the Strawbs (2008) (double CD recorded live at The Robin in Bilston 5 March 2006)
The Broken Hearted Bride (2008) (with the Hero and Heroine line-up)
Dancing to the Devil's Beat (2009)
Strawbs 40th Anniversary Celebration Vol. 1: Strawberry Fayre (2010)

Acoustic Strawbs
Painted Sky (2005) (Acoustic Strawbs live)
Acoustic Gold (2011)

Rick Wakeman
The Six Wives of Henry VIII (1973)
Crimes of Passion soundtrack (1984)
Glory Boys (1984)
Live at Hammersmith (1985)
Wakeman & Cousins – Hummingbird (2002)

Cry No More
Smile (1986)
Cry No More (1987)
Love and Power (1989) (produced by Andy Richards)
Strawbs 40th Anniversary Celebration Vol. 1: Strawberry Fayre (2010)

Solo
Mystic Mountain Music (2002)
Liberty [LP] (2022) (Renaissance Records)

Lambert Cronk
Touch the Earth (2007)

Steve Hackett
Time Lapse (2001)
Live Archive 70/80/90s (2001)
Defector: Deluxe Edition (2016 remaster – Disc 2 1981 Live at Reading Festival)

Singles
Unless otherwise stated, the details are of the singles released in the UK.

Strawbs
"Shine on Silver Sun"/"And Wherefore" (1973)
"Hero and Heroine"/"Why" (1974)
"Hold on to Me (The Winter Long)"/"Where do You Go" (1974)
"Round and Round"/"Heroine's Theme" (1974) (US and Italy only)
"Grace Darling"/"Changes Arrange Us" (1974)
"Angel Wine"/"Grace Darling" (1975) (Japan only)
"Lemon Pie"/"Don't Try to Change Me" (1975)
"Little Sleepy" (1975) (US and Portugal only)
"I Only Want My Love to Grow in You"/"Wasting My Time (Thinking of You)" (1976)
"So Close and Yet So Far Away"/"The Soldier's Tale" (1976) (US only)
"Charmer"/"Beside the Rio Grande" (1976)
"Back in the Old Routine"/"Burning for You" (1977)
"Keep on Trying"/"Simple Visions" (1977)
"Heartbreaker" (1977) (US and South Africa only)
"Joey and Me"/"Deadly Nightshade" (1978)
"New Beginnings"/"Words of Wisdom" (1978)
"I Don't Want to Talk About It"/"The Last Resort" (1978) (US only)

DVDs

Strawbs
 Complete Strawbs: The Chiswick House Concert (2002)
 Strawbs Live in Tokyo DVD, plus Grave New World, the movie (2003)

References

External links
Cry No More website
Chas Cronk at Strawbs website
Chas Cronk Website https://chascronk.com

Year of birth missing (living people)
Place of birth missing (living people)
Living people
English rock musicians
English rock singers
English male singer-songwriters
Strawbs members